Major professional sports league may refer to:

Major professional sports leagues in the United States and Canada
Major League § Sport

See also
Sports league
List of professional sports leagues